Joroinen is a municipality in the North Savo region of Finland. It is located in the province of Eastern Finland and is part of the Northern Savonia sub-region. The municipality has a population of approximately 4,626 people and covers an area of 982 square kilometers.

Joroinen was first mentioned in historical records in 1388, when it was part of the  Kingdom of Sweden. In the 16th century, the area was briefly annexed by Russia before being returned to Sweden. During the 18th century, Joroinen became part of the autonomous Grand Duchy of Finland, which was a satellite state of the Russian Empire.

Joroinen is known for its natural beauty and is a popular destination for tourists who enjoy outdoor activities such as hiking, fishing, and skiing. The municipality is home to several lakes, including Lake Joroinen and Lake Konnevesi, which are popular destinations for boating and swimming. In the winter, the area is covered in snow and is ideal for cross-country skiing and snowshoeing.

Joroinen is also home to several cultural attractions. The Joroinen Museum, which is located in the center of the municipality, offers visitors a glimpse into the history and culture of the area. The museum features exhibits on the local history, including the history of Joroinen's lakes and forests, as well as traditional crafts and folk art from the region.

The municipality of Joroinen is governed by a local council, which is elected every four years. The council is responsible for the administration of local services, such as education, healthcare, and social services.

Some villages

 Joroisniemi
 Järvikylä
 Kaijonkylä
 Kaitainen
 Katisenlahti
 Kerisalo
 Kerisalonsaari
 Kotkatlahti
 Kurkela
 Kuvansi
 Koskenkylä
 Lahnalahti
 Maavesi
 Montola
 Ruokojärvi
 Ruokoniemi
 Tahkoranta
 Uumaa

Historic manor houses of the area 

 Frugård
 Hoviniemi
 Joroisniemi, Braseborg
 Juhanala
 Järvikylä
 Karhulahti
 Korhola
 Koskenhovi
 Kotkanhovi
 Paajala, Örnevik
 Pasala
 Puomila
 Räisälänranta
 Stendal
 Torstila
 Tuomaala
 Virrantalo
 Vättilä

International relations

Twin towns — sister cities
Joroinen is twinned with:
  Ülenurme, Estonia

References

External links 

 Municipality of Joroinen – Official website

 
 
Populated places established in 1631
1631 establishments in Sweden